Benoit Charette (born July 19, 1976) is a Quebec politician elected in the 2008 provincial election for Deux-Montagnes. He was a member of the Parti Québécois, but left the party on June 21, 2011 to protest the party's focus on sovereignty. On December 19, 2011 he joined the Coalition Avenir Québec and is the current Minister of Sustainable Development and Environment. In 2021 he was assigned a new provincial role in combating racism.

A graduate of Université du Québec à Montréal with a bachelor's degree in history, he also studied municipal development at the École nationale d'administration publique. He worked as program manager at the Ministry of International Relations. He was also responsible for the documentation center at the Quebec General Delegation Délégation générale du Québec in Mexico.

Charette defeated the ADQ's Lucie Leblanc in Deux-Montagnes in the 2008 elections.

References

External links
 

Living people
Parti Québécois MNAs
Université du Québec à Montréal alumni
Coalition Avenir Québec MNAs
1976 births
21st-century Canadian politicians